John Frost may refer to:

John Frost (aviator), member of Early Birds of Aviation
John Frost (British Army officer) (1912–1993), British army officer, served in Operation Market Garden
John Frost Bridge, Arnhem, named after the army officer
John Frost (Chartist) (1784–1877), Welsh Chartist 
John Frost Square, Newport, named after the Chartist
John Frost (cricketer) (1847–1916), English cricketer
John Frost (footballer) (born 1980), Irish footballer
John Frost (minister) (1716–1779), first ordained Protestant minister in present-day Canada
Sir John Frost (physician) (1803–1840), founder of the Medico-Botanical Society of London, concerning the medical application of plants
Sir John Frost (1828–1918), Anglo-South African cabinet minister and landowner
John Frost (producer) (born 1952), Australian theatre producer
John Frost (republican) (1750–1842), English radical and secretary of the London Corresponding Society
John Frost (SAAF officer) (1918–1942), highest scoring air ace with a South African Air Force unit
John Carver Meadows Frost (1915–1979), British aircraft designer for the Avro Aircraft Company amongst others
John K. Frost (1922–1990), cytopathologist at Johns Hopkins Hospital
John W. Frost (born 1934), American tennis player of the 1950s and 1960s

See also
John Frost Nugent, Democratic senator from Idaho
Jack Frost (disambiguation)